Brede Waterworks is a waterworks at Brede, East Sussex, England. It was built to supply Hastings with drinking water. The waterworks still houses two of the three steam engines that were used to pump water from Brede to reservoirs at Fairlight and Baldslow.

Background

By the 1890s, Hastings Corporation was faced with increasing demand for water in the town. A recommendation was made that a site at Glynde would be suitable. This site had previously been identified in 1875. Another site identified as suitable was at West Dean, East Sussex. However, amateur geologist and councillor Thomas Elworthy recommended a site at Brede, claiming that its proximity to Hastings would make the scheme cheaper. In 1897, Hastings Corporation purchased Church House Farm, Brede and sunk three wells to supply Hastings with water. A pumping station was built to house a steam engine which pumped the water from the wells to a storage reservoir at Fairlight. The waterworks opened in 1904.

Tramway

Construction of the waterworks was aided by a  gauge tramway which ran from a wharf on the River Brede to the waterworks. A steam locomotive was used to haul construction materials. Four three-ton bogie open wagons were also provided. On completion of the waterworks, the tramway and locomotive were retained to bring coal from the wharf to the waterworks to supply the boilers for the steam engines. A pony was the alternate motive power when the steam locomotive was out of service. Although no public passenger service was provided, the tramway did carry passengers on occasion when officials from Hastings Corporation visited the waterworks. Straw and hessian sacks provided makeshift seating in the open wagons. In the 1920s, the River Brede ceased to be navigable, and that section of the tramway was abandoned. A road was built to serve the waterworks and the tramway closed c1937. The rails were later removed. From that date, coal was delivered by lorry directly to the waterworks from Hastings station. In 1964, electric pumps replaced the steam engines and the boilers were scrapped.

Locomotive

The locomotive used on the Brede Waterworks Tramway was a "Mercedes class" 0-4-0T steam locomotive, supplied by Bagnall, works number 1560/1899. It was named Brede in its early days. A new boiler was fitted in 1923 and the locomotive was rebuilt c1931 when the water tanks required replacement. The locomotive was withdrawn in 1935 as it was worn out, and subsequently scrapped.

The original building
The original waterworks building was built in the Baroque style. It housed two  triple expansion steam engines by Tangye of Birmingham. The engines were powered by four boilers which were built by Babcock & Wilcox of Lynchburg, Virginia, United States. One engine was scrapped in 1969 but the second has been restored. The building is Grade II listed.

The Worthington-Simpson building

In 1939, a new building was built in the Art Deco style. It houses a triple-expansion 
steam engine built in 1940 by Worthington-Simpson of Balderton, Nottinghamshire. At this date, the four Babcock & Wilcox boilers were replaced by two new ones from the same source. The new building was completed in 1942.

The engines

No 1 engine
No. 1 engine was identical to No 2 engine. It was scrapped in 1969.

No 2 engine
No. 2 engine was built by Tangye of Birmingham in 1904. It supplied the reservoirs at Fairlight and Baldslow.

The Worthington-Simpson engine
This engine was built by Worthington-Simpson of Balderton, works number 5058/1940 and was the last of its type supplied by Worthington-Simpson.

The boiler house

The boiler house originally housed four Babcock & Wilcox boilers. These were replaced in 1940 by two Babcock & Wilcox boilers. These were scrapped in 1964. The boiler house currently houses various steam engines and exhibits related to water supply.

See also
British Engineerium

References

External links

 Visiting the Giants of Brede - official site at Southern Water

18 in gauge railways in England
Industrial railways in England
Museums in East Sussex
Rail transport in East Sussex
Steam museums in England
Water supply and sanitation in England
Grade II listed buildings in East Sussex
Preserved stationary steam engines
Water supply pumping stations
Infrastructure completed in 1904
Infrastructure completed in 1939
Industry museums in England
1904 establishments in England
Waterworks